Peirson Lock (c.1690–1755) was a shipbuilder and designer for the Royal Navy who was Master Shipwright of Plymouth Dockyard from 1726 to 1742, and of Portsmouth Dockyard from 1742 to 1755.

History

He was born around 1690. In 1716 he was as Assistant Master Shipwright at Plymouth Dockyard under John Phillips, Master Shipwright. In 1718 he transferred to Portsmouth Dockyard before returning to Plymouth in December 1726 to replace Phillips as Master Shipwright. Thereafter the Royal Navy records his works.

In July 1742 he transferred from Plymouth to Portsmouth Dockyard.

In 1749 he designed the Wasp-class sloop and in 1752 designed the Fly-class sloop.

He died on 15 December 1755 at Portsmouth Dockyard.

His will was read on 22 January 1756 and is now held at the National Archive in Kew.

Ships built

HMS Mary Galley (rebuilt in 1726) 40-gun ship at Plymouth
Drake (1727), 2-gun yacht at Plymouth
HMS Experiment (rebuilt 1727) 20-gun frigate at Plymouth
Betty smack (1728) at Plymouth
Mary (1728) yacht at Plymouth
HMS Lichfield (1730) 50-gun ship of the line at Plymouth
HMS Saltash (1732), 8-gun sloop at Plymouth
HMS Swallow (1732) 60-gun ship of the line at Plymouth
HMS Warwick (1733) 60-gun ship of the line at Plymouth (sister to HMS Swallow)
HMS Weymouth (1736) 60-gun ship of the line at Plymouth
HMS Jersey (1736) 60-gun ship of the line at Plymouth (sister to HMS Weymouth)
HMS St Albans (1737) 50-gun ship of the line at Plymouth
HMS Severn (1739) 50-gun ship of the line at Plymouth
HMS Kingston (1740) 60-gun ship of the line at Plymouth
HMS Royal Oak (rebuilt 1741) 70-gun ship of the line at Plymouth
HMS Solebay (1742) 20 gun ship at Plymouth
HMS Princess Mary (1742) 60-gun ship of the line at Portsmouth
HMS Sunderland (1744) 60-gun ship of the line at Portsmouth
HMS Mediator (1745) refit of a captured American ship
HMS Tilbury (1745) 58-gun ship of the line at Portsmouth
Wasp, 8-gun sloop (1749)
Hazard, 8-gun sloop (1749)
HMS Grafton (1750) 68-gun ship of the line at Portsmouth
HMS Newcastle (1750) 50-gun ship of the line at Portsmouth
Fly, 8-gun sloop (1752)
HMS Chichester (1753) 68-gun ship of the line at Portsmouth
HMS Gibraltar (1754) 20-gun ship at Portsmouth

References

1755 deaths
People from Portsmouth
English shipbuilders
Year of birth uncertain